The Lebanese International School is a private school in Yaba, Lagos, Nigeria.  Commissioned in 1964 by the Lebanese embassy with classes ranging from kindergarten to twelfth grade, the embassy is still in charge of the school's board of trustees, which includes the Lebanese ambassador. Lebanese International School's Curriculum is mainly British based. Its language of instruction is English, but its Lebanese students often use both English and Arabic to communicate. Nationalities of students in the school include Nigerians, Lebanese, Syrians, Indians, Pakistanis and Germans.

Facilities
The school's facilities include an auditorium, computer laboratory, a television room and an art room. An indoor gymnasium, outdoor basketball court and laboratories for biology, chemistry, and physics were added during its renovation in the mid-1990s. It also has a library and a take-away cafeteria. The school also has fairly sized classrooms with ACs and whiteboards. Teachers and HODs also have their own staff room.

International examinations on offer
The school provides tenth, eleventh and twelfth grade students the opportunity to take the SAT I, SAT II, TOEFL, as well as University of Cambridge International Examinations such as IGCSE, AS Level and A Level examinations to qualify for admittance into foreign universities. Many students go on to attend colleges in Lebanon, Europe, Singapore, the United States, and Canada
In the early 2000s (decade), the school attained the permission to becoming a recognized International Cambridge Examination Center, with center number: NG193

School anthem
The school anthem was originally composed by a former principal of the school, Mr. Salem Abdul-Baki. In 1997, during a routine assembly, he played the audio version of the anthem via radio to hundreds of students on the basketball field.

The Lebanese and Nigerian national anthems are also played on Monday mornings.

References

External links

Lebanese International School

Cambridge schools in Nigeria
International schools in Lagos
Educational institutions established in 1964
Lebanese diaspora in Africa
1964 establishments in Nigeria